Talmei Yaffe (lit. Yaffe Furrows) is a moshav shitufi in southern Israel. Located near Ashkelon, it falls under the jurisdiction of Hof Ashkelon Regional Council.

History
Talmei Yaffe was founded in 1950 as a kibbutz by Jewish immigrants from Poland and Romania on the former lands of the depopulated  Palestinian village of Barbara.  It was named after Leib Yaffe, a director-general of Keren Hayesod who was killed in the car bombing of the Jewish Agency building in Jerusalem in 1948. In 1961 it was converted to a moshav shitufi.

In 2005, some families evacuated from settlements in Gush Katif in the wake of the Israeli disengagement from Gaza were resettled in Talmei Yaffe.

References

External links

Moshavim
Former kibbutzim
Populated places established in 1950
Populated places in Southern District (Israel)
Polish-Jewish culture in Israel
Romanian-Jewish culture in Israel
1950 establishments in Israel